Mazanabad may refer to:
 Mazanabad, Sardasht
 Mazanabad, Vazineh, Sardasht County